Art Is... is a 1971 American short documentary film directed by Julian Krainin. It was nominated for an Academy Award for Best Documentary Short.

See also
 List of American films of 1971

References

External links
 
 

1971 films
1971 documentary films
1971 short films
American short documentary films
American independent films
1970s short documentary films
1971 independent films
1970s English-language films
1970s American films